Sir Edward Hay Drummond-Hay (4 March 1815 – 24 January 1884) was a British naval officer, diplomat and colonial administrator.

He was born in England, son of Edward Drummond Hay, who was a nephew of the ninth Earl of Kinnoul. Like with his younger brother, John Hay Drummond Hay, he was educated at the Edinburgh Academy and then at Charterhouse. He was a Colonel of the 5th West India Regiment from 6 November 1854 to 15 August 1863.

From 1839 to 1850, he was the President of the British Virgin Islands.

From 1850 to 1855, he was the Governor of Saint Kitts.

From 1855 to 3 July 1863, he was the Governor of Saint Helena.

While he was governor of Saint Helena he devoted much of his attention to public works amongst which were the settlement Rupert's valley and the main drainage works of Jamestown.
In 1857 the church of St. John was started, and in 1861 the church of St. Matthew at Hut's Gate was built.

In September 1860, the governor received a visit from Prince Alfred, who was an officer in the Royal Navy serving on H.M.S. Euralus.

Hay was knighted in August 1859.

References

1815 births
1884 deaths
People educated at Charterhouse School
Governors of Saint Helena
Presidents of the British Virgin Islands
English people of Scottish descent
West India Regiment officers
Governors of British Saint Christopher
British colonial governors and administrators in Africa
British colonial governors and administrators in the Americas